Agata Tarczyńska is a Polish footballer who plays as a midfielder or striker for Frauen Bundesliga club Werder Bremen.

Career
Tarczyńska's first team was AZS Wroclaw, and she first played the UEFA Women's Cup with it at the age of 15.

In 2005 Tarczyńska signed for 1. FC Saarbrücken, in the 2. Bundesliga. The next season she returned to Poland, playing two seasons for Medyk Konin, three for AZS Wroclaw and one for Unia Racibórz.

In the 2012–13 winter transfer window she signed for SV Bardenbach in the 2. Bundesliga. She started the 2013–14 season in the same category with Blau-Weiß Hohen Neuendorf before moving to MSV Duisburg in the Bundesliga in the winter transfer window.

Duisburg was almost relegated, and Tarczyńska returned to Poland. She played one season for Zaglebie Lubin before returning to Medyk Konin for the 2015–16 season.

She is a member of the Poland national team.

Honours
KŚ AZS Wrocław
 Ekstraliga Kobiet: 2004, 2005
 Polish Cup: 2003–04, 2008–09

Medyk Konin
 Polish Cup: 2007–08

References

1988 births
Living people
Polish women's footballers
Women's association football forwards
Poland women's international footballers
Frauen-Bundesliga players
2. Frauen-Bundesliga players
1. FC Saarbrücken (women) players
Medyk Konin players
RTP Unia Racibórz players
MSV Duisburg (women) players
SV Werder Bremen (women) players
Place of birth missing (living people)
Polish expatriate sportspeople in Germany 
Expatriate women's footballers in Germany